Goran Prpić was the defending champion, but did not compete this year.

Dimitri Poliakov won the title by defeating Javier Sanchez 6–4, 6–4 in the final.

Seeds

Draw

Finals

Top half

Bottom half

References

External links
 Official results archove (ATP)

Croatia Open - Singles
1991 Singles
1991 in Croatian tennis